The Banggai cuscus (Strigocuscus pelengensis) is a species of cuscus, a type of possum. It is found in the Peleng and Sula Islands to the east of Sulawesi in Indonesia.

References

Possums
Mammals of Indonesia
Mammals described in 1945
Taxonomy articles created by Polbot